The Kingston upon Hull Central by-election was a Parliamentary by-election held on 5 July 1911. It returned one Member of Parliament (MP) to the House of Commons of the Parliament of the United Kingdom, elected by the first past the post voting system.

Vacancy
Seymour King the Conservative MP since 1885 was unseated on petition on 1 June 1911.

Electoral history

The Candidates
Mark Sykes was chosen as the new Conservative candidate to defend the seat. He had contested unsuccessfully, the Buckrose seat in Yorkshire at both 1910 general elections. 
The Liberals re-selected Robert Aske, their candidate here from the last election.

The Result

Aftermath
A general election was due to take place by the end of 1915. By the autumn of 1914, the following candidates had been adopted to contest that election. Due to the outbreak of war, the election never took place.
Unionist Party:Mark Sykes
Liberal Party:

Sykes was the endorsed candidate of the Coalition Government.

References 

Kingston upon Hull Central by-election
Kingston upon Hull Central by-election
By-elections to the Parliament of the United Kingdom in Yorkshire and the Humber constituencies
Elections in Kingston upon Hull
1910s in the East Riding of Yorkshire
Kingston upon Hull Central by-election
20th century in Kingston upon Hull